Ramosomyia is a genus in family Trochilidae, the hummingbirds, that was created in 2021 to replace Leucolia.

Taxonomy and species list

The genus contains three species:

Violet-crowned hummingbird, Ramosomyia violiceps
Green-fronted hummingbird, Ramosomyia viridifrons 
Cinnamon-sided hummingbird, Ramosomyia wagneri

These species were early placed in the genus Amazilia. A molecular phylogenetic study published in 2014 found that the genus Amazilia was polyphyletic. In the revised classification to create monophyletic genera, these Mexican species were placed in the resurrected genus Leucolia by some taxonomic systems. However, a study published in 2021 showed that Leucolia was not available because of the principle of priority. The authors proposed the new genus Ramosomyia and in mid-2022 it was adopted by the North American Classification Committee of the American Ornithological Society and the International Ornithological Committee. As of that date the Clements taxonomy retains the three species in Leucolia and BirdLife International's Handbook of the Birds of the World in the earlier Amazilia.

References

Ramosomyia
Bird genera